Rajbeer Singh is an Indian actor and model who works in Hindi film and television . He appeared in the Hindi horror film Who's There? as Sunny Malhotra.

Career
Singh made his television debut on the STAR Plus reality show Perfect Bride. He also played an episodic role on Rishta.com. From 2013 to 2014, Singh played the lead role of Hatim on the Life OK series The Adventures of Hatim. He then acted out the role of Azaad, the lead male role in Zee TV's Qubool Hai Season 4, from August 2015 to November 2015. In Qubool Hai, Singh acted the role of a half-vampire opposite female lead Surbhi Jyoti.

Filmography

Television
2009 Perfect Bride as himself
2010 Rishta.com
2013–2014 The Adventures of Hatim as Hatim
2015 Qubool Hai as Azaad Iqbal Khan

Films
2011 Who's There?
2016 Ishq Junoon
2016 ''Club Dancer

References

External links
 
 

Living people
Indian male television actors
Indian male film actors
Male actors in Hindi cinema
Male actors from Punjab, India
Punjabi people
1982 births
People from Pathankot district
People from Punjab, India